Hanasakeru Seishōnen  is a Shōjo manga series  written and illustrated by Natsumi Itsuki. The manga was serialized in Hakusensha's shōjo magazine (aimed at teenage girls), LaLa from February 24, 1987 to March 24, 1987 and again from August 24, 1989 to August 24, 1994.


Original Volumes list

Re-released Volumes

References

External links

Hanasakeru Seishonen